Lindale and Newton-in-Cartmel (sometimes spelled without hyphens) is a civil parish in the South Lakeland District of Cumbria, England, known until April 2018 as Allithwaite Upper or Upper Allithwaite. It contains 17 listed buildings that are recorded in the National Heritage List for England.  Of these, two are listed at Grade II*, the middle of the three grades, and the others are at Grade II, the lowest grade.  The parish is in the Lake District National Park.  It contains the villages of Lindale, High Newton, and Low Newton, and is otherwise rural.  The listed buildings consist of farmhouses, farm buildings, houses with associated structures, the wall of a Friends' burial ground, a limekiln, a bridge, two memorials, and a church.


Key

Buildings

References

Citations

Sources

Lists of listed buildings in Cumbria
South Lakeland District